Bapna also spelt Bafana or Bapna or Bafna  (Hindi: बाफना / बाफणा )is an Indian Jain community, and also the surname used by this community. The name is derived from Bahufana and Bafanha. They were Rajput and embraced Jainism. Bafnas are also known as Bapnas, Baphana.

History 
After seventy years of nirvana of 24th Tirthankara Mahavira, in 457 B.C.(Vira Nirvana Samvat-70), the Paramara sect of North Indian King Prithvipal's heir, King Jobanpal and Prince Sachchipal 
Acharya told him to reminiscence the Bahufana Parshvanath Shatrunjay Maha Mantra at the intervals of 12,000.

Both the Kshatriya clan recited the 'Mantra' to gain victory, with every 12,000 recitations of the mantra, the battle horses got 12,000 times more power which eventually led them to victory.

When King Jobanpal and Prince Sachchipal were on their way towards Dhar (Madhya Pradesh, India) they got a flash of images of the Acharya, it came to their knowledge that Jain Acharya Jinvallabhsuriji was no more and Shri Jinduttsuriji was appointed as the new Jain Acharya (senior Jain monk).

Both of them immediately went to the newly appointed Acharya Jinduttsuri. They declared their clan's name as "Bahufana" (now more commonly known as "Bafna").

Sub-sect of Bafna Clan
There were total 37 sons in the family of King Jobanpal and Sachchipal.

One of them was known as "Bafna" and other 36 got their new surnames as per their work and quality, on the eve of establishment of Oswal sect by Jain Acharya Ratnaprabhsuriji.

New names of 36 son are as follows:- 1.Nahta, 2.Rayjada, 3.Patva, 4.Hundiya, 5.Marothiya, 6.Samuliya, 7.Bathiyan, 8.Jangda, 9.Somaliya, 10.Dungrecha, 11.Kotecha, 12.Bagmar, 13.Kuchera, 14.Bhabu, 15.Baliya, 16.Nahusuri, 17.Dhampal, 18.Nangani, 19.Bhungarwal, 20.Betala, 21.Mahajaniya 22.Basah, 23.Dhaturiya, 24.Maru, 25.Bhoota, 26.Khorwal, 27.Makelwal, 28.Sahala, 29. Thoola, 30.Dasora, 31.Kalrohi, 32.Khorua, 33.Soni, 34.Joshaliya, 35.Sambhoota and 36.Jhota etc.

It is, thus proved that all the above sects are the part of the Bafna clan and their "Kuldevi" (goddess of clan) is Amba [ Form of Durga] so all the above sects have same faith as that of Bafna, in Sachiya Mata Temple of Osian.

Baphanas of Kosana, Now at Nashik

In 1009, Gaon: Khajwaan our ancestral one 'Saati' We were in Kosaana in 1799. We were in Maharashtra, khandala near aurangabad in 1890. Then we came to Niphad in 1894. Then we shift to Umbarkhed in 1899(where Hiralaljiis Mashiji lived there & her 5 sons drowned in Kadwa River). In 1931, Lakhichandjis mother died. On 3 March 1972 Hilralalji died. On 22 February 1995 Gajarabai died. On 6 January 2015 Lakhichandji died.

Family Tree
 Maharaja Upaldev Pawar
 Maharaja Baldev (left Shivdharma & follow Jainism in 1175 - Vikram samvad) also named as 'Baphana'
  Narayandasji
  Devdasji
   Simratsinghji
   Indrabhanji
   Raibhanji
   Khivsinghji
   Bhagchandji (1708)
   Davarji (1804)
   Sujoji
   Maanji
   Mulchandji
 Khivrajji - Chotalalji
   Hiralalji - Nainsukhji - Chunilalji
   Lakhichandji (dob 26-1-1924 Death 6-1-2015)-Chhaganlalji(dob 06-09-1936 Death 5-10-2009)
   Kantilalji (dob 3-8-1948)

Bafnas of Bhinmal
The Bafna clan came to town Bhinmal Rajasthan in 1401 A.D. (1457 Vikram Samvat) from Tavari village near Osian town Rajasthan, India. Bhinmal is the birth and native place of well-known Sanskrit poet Mahakavi Magha and mathematician-astronomer Brahmagupta (ब्रह्मगुप्त).

The land of Bhinmal got purity after visit of Jain Tirthankar Lord Mahavira. The historical attachment of the land of Bhinmal with Shri Jain Acharya Gnanvimalsuri, Acharya Haribhadrasuri, Shri Manudasgani, Jain Acharya  Udyotansuri, Acharya Siddharshigani, Pujya Gurudev, Acharya Shrimad Rajendrasuri.

The Bafna clan came in 13th Vikram century in this historical and Jain Religious City Bhinmal.

First person Shri Tolaji Bafna, his son Shri Dayaji and his son's grandson Shri Malaji Bafna came first time in Bhinmal from Tawari village (Osiya- Jodhpur-Rajasthan). Their family settled in the area was known as Malaji ka Chohta which was known as "Malniyon ka chohta" nowadays. Businessmen and Jain community's Holi Gair dance was started by Malaji Bafna. There were four families of Malaji, the first was Sangvanji's family which went to Dhanera and settled nearly there, second was Nimbaji's family which is Hinduji's family nowadays, third was Khelaji's family which is Deepani family and the fourth was Lakhmaji's family which Sagarji's family and Suraji's family today. All of their families except first, are in Bhinmal at present. The original house of Malaji is today owned by Dharamchandji Bafna and their sons, one of whom is a senior vice president at Goldman Sachs.

Thereafter, Rekhaji Bafna and Jodaji Heeraji - Raghunathji Bafna's family came to Bhinmal from Nagaur District of Rajasthan. Out of them, Rekhaji's family settled near by Chhoti School (Small-School) - vegetable market area which is known as Rupaniyon ka Mohalla and Todaji's family settled in the area of Dhora-dhal. There were two family constituted from this family which are Manroopji's family and Kasroorji - Pratapji - Chnotmalji's family and which are now exist.

As contemporaries of these, the family of Heemaji Bafna came Bhinmal from Rajikawas and settled in Dhora-dhal region which is veermaji's family now. All these Bafna families have been residing in Bhinmal for 500–600 years. Thereafter Ukhchandji Peraji's family came Bhinmal from Panthedi, which is part of Malaji's family of Deepani's family in origin there ancestor Shri Dhashrathji went to Panthedi. Their sons Umedmalji, Walchandji, Hirachandji & Kishormalji settled in the area of Khari Road also known as Haddiyon Ki Wa. The great-grandson of Heemaji Bafna, Rajkumar Bafna contested the 2009 Assembly elections from the Malabar Hill constituency, Maharashtra from the Indian National Congress party.

The Bafnas of Bhinmal have established Bafna Research Centre & Cultural Society (Bhinmal). This society has made one three-temple complex for their worship, at Bhinmal, Rajasthan. The temple complex is named "Shri Bafna Wadi Jain Tirth".

Bafnas or Bapnas of Jaisalmer
Deoraj Bafna left Osian in the early 18th century and migrated to Jaisalmer. He started many businesses and then settled on the gold and silver Brocade business. He struggled until the end of his life, when his enterprising son Guman Chand joined his business and they became prosperous. Guman Chand became highly successful and wealthy in the Brocade business and came to be known as Seth Guman Chand Patwa (Patwa being the occupational title for the Brocade business). Seth Guman Chand commissioned the construction of five magnificent Havelis, for his five sons, around 1805. These are the famous Patwon Ki Havelis in Jaisalmer. Due to a variety of reasons, the five sons of Guman Chand, had to leave Jaisalmer, but all settled in different areas and prospered in business. The most famous was Guman Chand's third son, Jorawar Mal Bapna. He branched out from Brocade business into Banking and established around 300 branches across India, the Middle East and China in the early 19th century. Jorawar Mal Bapna became one of the wealthiest persons in India and also became a prominent diplomat who acted as a go between the British and the local Rajput  Princes. Jorawar Mal also commissioned the construction of a Jain temple in Jaisalmer and made significant contributions to various Jain places of worship around Rajasthan and elsewhere.

Jorawarl Mal also became a close friend of the famous Col. Tod, who writes about him in his "Annals and Antiquities of Rajputana".    Around 1819, the house of Mewar was in deep financial trouble. Yearly raids by the Marathas had depleted the treasury and the Maharana was unable to deal with the situation. Upon the recommendation of Col Tod, Maharana Bhim Singh invited Seth Jorawarmal Bapna to Udaipur in 1819 and appointed him "Nagar Seth" and also the state treasurer. Seth Jorawar Mal Bapna stayed in Udaipur for a few years and in a short period turned around the finances of the state of Mewar and also advanced the Maharana a sum of Rs. 20 Lakhs out of which he forgave about Rs. 12 Lakhs. His work done, he set up his sons, Sultanmal Bapna and Chandan Mal Bapna in Seth Ji Ri Haveli in Udaipur and asked the Maharana to allow him to leave Udaipur to look after his far flung business interests. Seth Jorawar Mal Bapna died in Indore.

Seth Sahib Jorawar Mal Bapna's son Sultan Mal Bapna had no heir, but he took over as Nagar Seth of Udaipur. His younger brother Seth Chandan Mal took over Seth Jorawar Mal Bapna's businesses outside of Udaipur and started to manage them from Indore. From all accounts the brothers did well and prospered in Udaipur, but their other businesses suffered due to volatile political situation and the gadar of 1857. After Sultan Mal Bapna's death, his brother, Seth Chandan Mal Sahib returned to Udaipur and became Nagar Seth for a short period of time. After Seth Chandan Mal Saheb's death, his son Seth Chhogmal Ji Bapna became the Nagar Seth of Udaipur.

Seth Chhogmal ji Bapna continued to run the family business very ably, and also attempted to diversify away from money lending into other businesses. He continued to collect the Mewar State revenues through his agency. He was also the treasurer of the Mewar Bhil Corps. In 1892 the new Maharana Fateh Singh, used Seth Chhog Mal Bapna to teach the British Government a lesson. It was well known that since the days of Seth Jorawar Mal Bapna, the Nagar Seths of Udaipur were highly respected by the British Government and the British AGG and the British Resident. There developed a dispute between the Resident Agent and the Maharana. On the instigation of certain court officials such as Kothari Balwant Rai, the Maharana manufactured a false charge against Seth Chhog Mal Bapna and ordered the confiscation of his Jagir (the village of Parsoli), his shops, his goods and his property, essentially rendering him bankrupt. The British Resident Agent attempted to intervene, but the British Viceroy refused to intervene out of larger political considerations. Seth Chhog Mal Bapna's personal effects were auctioned off and he died while the auction was still going on.

Seth Chhog Mal Bapna had three sons, who now were all on the street, overnight going from one of the richest families in India to being penniless. His second son, Siremal Bapna was a brilliant student and he continued his studies with the help of his father in law, Mehta Jagannath Singh, the Prime Minister of Mewar and successfully completed his law degree standing first in the University and winning a gold medal.

Siremal Bapna became the Prime Minister of Holkar state and excelled at being an administrator. He became well known in his time and was Prime Minister of states such as Ratlam, Alwar, Bikaner and home minister of Patiala State. He was the Indian Ambassador to the League of Nations and the Indian Delegate in the Round Table Conference in London with Mahatma Gandhi. He was knighted by the British and came to be known as Sir Siremal Bapna. His honesty and generosity were legendary and he gave away all his money, to a point where when he retired as Prime Minister, he did not have his own house to live in, an example unheard of in Modern India. Sir Siremal Bapna died in Indore in 1964. The grateful city of Indore honored Sir Siremal Bapna by erecting a statue of him in a public square.

Sir Siremal had two sons, Kalyan Mal Bapna and Pratap Singh Bapna. Both were prominent bureaucrats in Holker State. After independence, Pratap Singh Bapna was awarded the IAS and he became a powerful, Chief Secretary level officer in the government of MP. His achievements in service are legendary and his name is mentioned in various Administrative Manuals of MP. After retirement, Pratap Singh Bapna continued his public service and conceived of a highly innovative Water Supply Scheme for the city of Indore, by pumping water from River Narmada to Indore, a distance of about 50 miles. He was made the Chairman of the Narmada Advisory Committee by the then Chief Minister of MP, Shyama Charan Shukla and under Pratap Singh Bapna's leadership the project went off without a hitch, on time and on schedule. This was the last successfully executed public works project in Indore until now, which completed without any corruption and on time. Pratap Singh Bapna served on the Senate of Devi Ahilya University and he had an integral role in bringing the university to Indore. He was also a founder member of the Govind Ram Seksaria Institute of Technology and Science Society, being instrumental in the formation of that institution. He was the Chairmen of various trusts and charities and dies in his sleep on 20 June 1992.

Pratap Singh Bapna's elder son, Rajendra Singh Bapna resides in Indore in retirement and his only son Upendra Singh Bapna manages the family affairs. Upendra Singh Bapna is married to Kalpana Bapna and they have two children, Jai Pratap Singh Bapna who is an undergraduate at University of Southern California in Los Angeles USA and Monika Bapna who is an undergraduate at Georgetown University in Washington DC.

The Bapna family also worships Sachiya Mata as their Kul Devi. The family also has a Dharamshaalaa in Palitana by the name of Chand Bhavan.

Baphnas of Tiloli, Bhilwara

Tiloli also known as Tilakpuri in some official records is a small village within Asind tehsil of Bhilwara district in Mewar region of Rajasthan, India. The village is situated around 60 km north east of Bhilwara district headquarters in the foothills of Aravali range. Village’s demography consists of people of various castes predominantly Hindu with a very influential Jain community. The patriarch of Tiloli’s Baphna family, Jodhraj Baphna was one of the Mewar’s regions better established merchant. He was regarded as the ‘Nagar Seth’ of the Asind area. The history of Baphna clan prior to Jodhraj Baphna is rather sketchy and speculations are that few generations before Jodhraj Baphna; as Tiloli was being founded, the Baphnas may have migrated from one of the nearby regions (Tiloli is strategically at the cusp of both Mewar and Marwar regions) to fill in the traders’ roles.

With the patronage of Tiloli’s Thakurs and their own industriousness they rose to become the most prominent family of the area.

All of the Jains in Tiloli are followers of Acharya Bhikshu’s and his successors who follow Shwetamber Terapanthi traditions. Some other prominent families are that of  Chordias, Gokhrus, Naulakahs and Bumbs.

Jodhraj Baphna had many sons and daughters but the record is available only for only one of his five sons. The names of his five sons in the order of their seniority are Rikhab Das, Lobh Chand, Lal Chand, Har Lal and Megh Raj.  Rikhab Das inherited the mantle of taking the family business forward. There is not much information available as of today about the lives and subsequent family trees of these brothers except that of second son Lobh Chand. Lobh Chand had three sons who reached adulthood and theirs names (in order) are Suva Lal, Fateh Lal and Moti Lal.

Suva Lal had two sons Devilal and Rajmal from his first wife Nani Bai, and three sons, Ambalal, Ganeshlal, Mishrilal and a daughter Sugan Bai with his second wife Dhapu Bai. Two of his older sons from Dhapu Bai namely Ambalal and Ganeshlal were adopted by his younger brother Fateh Lal who didn’t have any sons or daughters of his own. Not much information is available about Moti Lal.

Rajmal Baphna married Gattu Bai and had three sons HarakChand, Chandmal and Moolchand and a daughter Jeth Kanwar. GattuBai lived to be over 95 years old and her life touched five generations of Baphnas. Jeth Kanwar was married early but her life took a tragic turn when she lost her husband at an early age. She then turned more religious and exhibited a desire to get enunciated into Jain ascetic way of life (monkhood). At an appropriate time, she took a diksha and formally became a Jain nun who in time rose to become one of the most celebrated nuns (Maharasa) of Shwetamber jain traditions.

Harak Chand started his own business of cotton trading. He ultimately moved from Tiloli to another nearby town ‘Bijainagar’ (also known as Vijaynagar) in Ajmer district of Marwar region and lived most of his life there where he raised his own four sons and a daughter. His four sons are Madan Lal who is a retired school principal settled in Ajmer, Manohar Lal who is a retired Bank Manager (erstwhile Bank of Rajasthan Ltd.) settled in Bhilwara, Late Dr. Prem Chand who was a prominent eye surgeon of Bhilwara area and Tara Chand who is AGM of a private firm in Bengaluru area.  Harak Chand’s only daughter Lad Bai (also known as Priti) is married to Sudarshan Khabya who retired as DGM of erstwhile Bank of Rajasthan Ltd. and currently lives in Jaipur.

Bafnas of Khichan, Phalodi, Jodhpur

Seth Ratan Singhji Bafna came to Khichan from Naya Gaon along with his 6 sons somewhere in second half of the 19th century. The six sons were 1) Sri Gulabchandji, 2) Sri Bhomrajji, 3) Sri Meghrajji, 4) Sri Magniramji, 5) Sri Bhagiramji and 6) Sri Sadar Singhji

Seth Bhomrajji Bafna had 2 sons namely, Hindumalji and Virdichandji. Sri Hindumalji had 3 sons, namely, Pabudanji, Kanyalalji and Khushalchandji. Sri Khushalchandji took Jain Diksha and called Sri Khushal Muniji M.S.

Seth Magniramji had 3 sons, namely, 1) Sri Sujanmalji, 2) Sri Manaklalji and 3) Sri Hiralalji Bafna.  Sujanmalji settled in Amalner, Maharashtra, while  Manaklalji and Hiralalji settled in Madras (now Chennai).  Sri Manaklalji had 3 sons namely, 1) Sri Nemichandji, 2) Sri Champalalji and 3) Sri Kasturchandji.  Though Manaklalji had come to Madras, these 3 children stayed in Khichan family. After some time these 3 children also shifted to Madras.

Nemichandji had 2 sons, namely Nathmalji and Ashkaranji.  Champalalji had 3 sons namely Loonkaranji, Jamanalalji and Ummedmalji. Ummedmalji aged about 75 years staying in Kondithope, Chennai. Kasturchanji has 3 sons namely, Goutamchanji (now shifted to and staying in Bulthana, Maha). Motilalji and Devrajji in Sowcarpet, Chennai. loonkaranji had eight sons, namely parasmalji, tarachandji, virendarji, bharathji, gajenderji, Dharam kirthiji, manmohanji, and Rameshji and one daughter yeswanti bai. Ramesh ji has two sons vinay and lokesh.
Ashkaranji has 4 sons, namely, Omprakash, Navratanmal, Vijay Kumar, Jitendra Kumar.

Bapnas of Jodhpur

Shri Sabalramji had a son named Shri Kaluramji who had two sons Shri Ramlalji and Shri Motilalji.

Bafnas of Asind
Hamirmal Bafna
Hiralal Bafna 
Kesarimal Bafna
Ranglal Bafna
Mulchand Bafna
Goverdhanlal Bafna
Gheesulal Bafna
Bherulal Bafna
Manoharlal Bafna

Bafna's of Jodhpur

One of the Bafna families living in Jodhpur come's from the Sirohi Branch of the clan.

References

Indian surnames
Social groups of Rajasthan